is a Japanese voice actress and narrator affiliated with I'm Enterprise. She is widely known for her work, such as Tamako Kitashirakawa in Tamako Market.

Biography
Suzaki is good at singing, and lists soft tennis and scuba diving as her favorite sport. Her hobbies are playing the trumpet and flower arrangement. She is also a licensed teacher.

She performed the opening and ending themes to the anime Tamako Market under her character name Tamako Kitashirakawa.

She received one of the Best Female Newcomers at the 9th Seiyu Awards in March 2015.

In December 2019, Suzaki married anime writer Takashi Ifukube.

Filmography

Television animation
2010
Bakuman.: Misayo Amane (Ep. 22)

2011
Manyū Hiken-chō: Grass C

2012
My Little Monster: Female Student B (Ep. 6)
To Love Ru: Darkness: Female Student (Ep. 12), Schoolgirl B (Ep. 5)

2013
A Certain Scientific Railgun S: Rikō Takitsubo
Bakuman. 3: Keiko Naka (Ep. 23)
Da Capo III: Nakayama
Day Break Illusion: Cerebrum (girl, Eps. 5-8)
Haganai NEXT: Gal (Ep. 11), Galge (Ep. 6)
Jewelpet Happiness: Student
Kill la Kill: Mako Mankanshoku
Kiniro Mosaic: Classmate Girl B (Ep. 5)
Kyōsōgiga: Girl (Ep. 1), Shrine Girl
Kotoura-san: Store Clerk (Ep. 8)
Little Busters!: Yumi (Ep. 24)
Oreimo 2: Alpha (Ep. 1), Ran-chin (Ep. 10)
Oreshura: Rin Kawachi (Ep. 13), Waitress (Ep. 8)
Phi Brain: Kami no Puzzle: Nono (Ep. 10)
Ro-Kyu-Bu! SS: Hiiragi Takenaka
Sasami-san@Ganbaranai: Classmate F (Ep. 10)
Senki Zesshō Symphogear G: Announcer (Eps. 4, 5)
Stella Women's Academy, High School Division Class C3: Kazuha (Eps. 10-13)
Tamako Market: Tamako Kitashirakawa
The "Hentai" Prince and the Stony Cat.: Moriya
Yuyushiki: Female Student C (Ep. 4)

2014
Aikatsu!: Mikuru Natsuki
Brynhildr in the Darkness: Kana Tachibana
Daimidaler the Sound Robot: Likantz Seaberry, Announcer (Ep. 1)
Girl Friend BETA: Kurumi Eto
Invaders of the Rokujyōma!?: Shizuka Kasagi
Knights of Sidonia: Shizuka Hoshijiro
Magi: The Kingdom of Magic: Marga
Robot Girls Z: Poses O2
Trinity Seven: Selina Sherlock

2015
Assassination Classroom: Kaede Kayano
Classroom Crisis: Tsubasa Hanaoka
Kantai Collection: Akatsuki class, Mogami, Hōshō, Aoba
Knights of Sidonia: Battle for Planet Nine: Shizuka Hoshijiro, Tsumugi Shiraui
RIN-NE: Rika, Girl E (Ep. 11)
Suzakinishi the Animation: Aya Suzaki
Go! Princess PreCure: Karin Akehoshi
The IDOLM@STER Cinderella Girls: Minami Nitta
Wish Upon the Pleiades: Aoi's Friend

2016
Ajin: Demi-Human: Eriko Nagai
Assassination Classroom Second Season: Kaede Kayano
Phantasy Star Online 2: The Animation: Washinomiya Kohri (ep 5)
D-Gray-man Hallow: Emilia Galmar

2017
ACCA: 13-Territory Inspection Dept.: Ada
The Idolmaster Cinderella Girls Theater (4 seasons; April 2017-June 2019): Minami Nitta
Battle Girl High School: Miki Hoshitsuki
Juni Taisen: Kiyoko Inō (Ep. 1)
Mahōjin Guru Guru: Churu (Ep. 5)

2018
BanG Dream! Girls Band Party! Pico: Marina Tsukishima
Happy Sugar Life: Shōko Hida
Release the Spyce: Mei Yachiyo
Himote House: Tae Hongou
A Certain Magical Index III: Rikō Takitsubo

2019
BanG Dream! 2nd Season: Marina Tsukishima
Magical Girl Spec-Ops Asuka: Asuka Otori
Miru Tights: Homi Moegi
Kandagawa Jet Girls: Kuromaru Manpuku

2020
BanG Dream! Girls Band Party! Pico: Ohmori: Marina Tsukishima
Journal of the Mysterious Creatures: Lily
Super HxEros: Miharichuu
Rail Romanesque: Kiko

2021
Back Arrow: Atlee Ariel
Ancient Girl's Frame: Luna Mariano Perez Lupiano
BanG Dream! Girls Band Party! Pico Fever!: Marina Tsukishima

2022
Cue!: Rio Isuzu
Girls' Frontline: Simonov
RWBY: Ice Queendom: Nora Valkyrie
Lucifer and the Biscuit Hammer: Yayoi Hakudō
Kantai Collection: Let's Meet at Sea: Akatsuki class, Mogami, Hōshō, Aoba
Extreme Hearts: Emi Hōjō

2023
Farming Life in Another World: Tia

TBA
The Demon Sword Master of Excalibur Academy: Regina

Movies
2014
Aikatsu! The Movie: Mikuru Natsuki
Tamako Love Story: Tamako Kitashirakawa

2015
Ajin Part 1: Shōdō: Eriko Nagai
Knights of Sidonia: Shizuka Hoshijiro
Harmony: Cian Reikado

2017
Blame!: Tae
Godzilla: Planet of the Monsters: young Haruo

2021
Knights of Sidonia: Love Woven in the Stars: Shizuka Hoshijiro

Video games
2011
THE IDOLM@STER Cinderella Girls: Minami Nitta

2013
Akiba's Trip: Undead & Undressed: Nana
Kantai Collection: Hōshō, Aoba, Mogami, Akatsuki, Hibiki/Верный, Ikazuchi, Inazuma

2014
Guilty Gear Xrd: Elphelt Valentine
Hyrule Warriors: Proxi

2015
Battle Girl High School: Miki Hoshitsuki
Flowers - Le volume sur Ete-: Chidori Takasaki
Grand Sphere: Comette the Automaton
Hyper Galaxy Fleet: Shimamoto Izumi
Under Night In-Birth Exe:Late[st]: Mika
Valkyrie Drive -Bhikkhuni-: Rinka Kagurazaka

2016
Flowers - Le volume sur Automne-: Chidori Takasaki
Granblue Fantasy: Cucouroux
Phantasy Star Online 2: Washinomiya Kohri
Girls' Frontline: Simonov, M9

2017
BanG Dream! Girls Band Party!: Marina Tsukishima
Fire Emblem Heroes: Maria, Ninian
 Magia Record: Puella Magi Madoka Magica Side Story: Manaka Kurumi
Flowers - Le volume sur Hiver-: Chidori Takasaki

2018
Soulcalibur VI: Chai Xianghua
Grand Chase: Dimensional Chaser: Sage
Master of Eternity: Leahs and Maiyo
Azur Lane: Ryuujou
Higurashi When They Cry Hō: Une

2020

 Kandagawa Jet Girls: Kuromaru Manpuku
 Moe! Ninja Girls RPG: Akari Hanao
 Ash Arms: Panzer V Panther, SU-26

2021
 Rune Factory 5: Scarlett
 Genshin Impact: Sayu
 Final Fantasy XIV: Endwalker: Livingway

2022
Xenoblade Chronicles 3: Manana

2023
Goddess of Victory: Nikke: Jackal

Drama CD
Imōto ga ō Sugite Nemurenai: Isaribi

2015
Benichidori no Hanakotoba: Takasaki Chidori

Dubbing
Exchange Student Zero: Happy Peach Flower

References

External links
Official agency profile 

1986 births
Living people
I'm Enterprise voice actors
Japanese video game actresses
Japanese voice actresses
Tokyo Gakugei University alumni
Voice actresses from Ishikawa Prefecture
21st-century Japanese actresses